This is a list of awards and nominations received by Lil Wayne.

American Music Awards
The American Music Awards is an annual award ceremony created by Dick Clark in 1974. Lil Wayne received eight nominations and won once in 2017.

|-
|rowspan="2"|2008
||Lil Wayne
|Favorite Male Hip-Hop/Rap Artist
|
|-
|Tha Carter III
|Favorite Hip-Hop/Rap Album
|
|-
|rowspan="3"|2011
|rowspan="2"|Lil Wayne
|Artist of the Year
|
|-
|Favorite Rap/Hip-Hop Artist
|
|-
|Tha Carter IV
|Favorite Rap/Hip-Hop Album
|
|-
|2013
|Lil Wayne
|Favorite Rap/Hip-Hop Artist
|
|-
|rowspan="4"|2017
|rowspan="2"|"I'm the One" (with DJ Khaled, Quavo, Chance the Rapper, & Lil Wayne)
|Favorite Rap/Hip-Hop Song
|
|rowspan="4"|
|-
|rowspan="2"|Collaboration of the Year
|
|-

BET Awards

|-
|2005
|"Soldier" (with Destiny's Child & T.I.)
|Best Collaboration
|
|-
|rowspan="2"|2007
|Lil Wayne
|Best Male Hip Hop Artist
|
|-
|"Stuntin' Like My Daddy" (with Birdman)
|Viewer's Choice Award
|
|-
|rowspan="3"|2008
|Lil Wayne
|Best Male Hip-Hop Artist
|
|-
|"I'm So Hood (remix)" (with DJ Khaled, Ludacris, Busta Rhymes, Big Boi, Young Jeezy, Fat Joe, Birdman & Rick Ross)
|Best Collaboration
|
|-
|"Lollipop" (with Static Major)
|Viewer's Choice Award
|
|-
|rowspan="5"|2009
|Lil Wayne
|Best Male Hip-Hop Artist
|
|-
|rowspan="2"|"Turnin' Me On" (with Keri Hilson)
|Best Collaboration
|
|-
|rowspan="3"|Viewer's Choice Award
|
|-
|"Can't Believe It" (with T-Pain)
|
|-
|"A Milli"
|
|-
|rowspan="4"|2010
|rowspan="2"|Young Money
|Best New Artist
|
|-
|Best Group
|
|-
|"Forever" (with Drake, Eminem, Kanye West)
|Best Collaboration
|
|-
|Bedrock
|Viewer's Choice Award
|
|-
|rowspan="5"|2011
|Lil Wayne
|Best Hip Hop Artist
|
|-
|rowspan="3"|"Look at Me Now" (with Chris Brown & Busta Rhymes)
|Video of the Year
|
|-
|Best Collaboration
|
|-
|rowspan="2"|Viewer's Choice Award
|
|-
|"6 Foot 7 Foot" (with Cory Gunz)
|
|-
|rowspan="5"|2012
|rowspan="2"|Lil Wayne
|Best Hip Hop Artist
|
|-
|FANdemonium Award
|
|-
|"I'm On One" (with DJ Khaled, Rick Ross & Drake)
|rowspan="2"|Best Collaboration
|
|-
|rowspan="2"|"The Motto" (with Drake and Tyga)
|
|-
|Viewer's Choice
|
|-
|rowspan="2"|2013
||HYFR  (with Drake)
||Video of the Year
|
|-
|| Pop That  (with French Montana, Rick Ross & Drake)
||Best Collaboration
|
|-
|rowspan="3"|2015
|rowspan="2"|Loyal  (with Chris Brown & Tyga)
||Video of the Year
|
|-
||Best Collaboration
|
|-
||Only  (with Nicki Minaj, Drake & Chris Brown)
||Viewers' Choice Award
|
|-
|2016
|rowspan="2"|2 Chainz & Lil Wayne
|rowspan="2"|Best Duo/Group
|
|-
|rowspan="2"|2017
|
|-
| "No Problem"  (with Chance the Rapper & 2 Chainz)
|rowspan="2"|Best Collaboration
|
|-
|2021
|rowspan="1"|"Whats Poppin (Remix)"  (with Jack Harlow, DaBaby & Tory Lanez)
|
|}

BET Hip Hop Awards

!
|-
|rowspan="6"|2007
|rowspan="2"|Lil Wayne
|Best Live Performance
|
|
|-
|Lyricist of the Year
|
|
|-
|rowspan="2"|"We Takin' Over" (with DJ Khaled, Akon, T.I., Rick Ross, Fat Joe, & Birdman)
|Alltel People's Champ Award
|
|
|-
|Best Hip Hop Collabo
|
|
|-
|rowspan="2"|"Stuntin' Like My Daddy" with (with Birdman)
|Best Hip Hop Collabo
|
|-
|Alltel People's Champ Award
|
|-
|rowspan="10"|2008
|rowspan="4"|Lil Wayne
|Hustler of the Year
|
|
|-
|MVP of the Year
|
|
|-
|Lyricist of the Year
|
|
|-
|Best Live Performer
|
|
|-
|Tha Carter III
|CD of the Year
|
|
|-
||"A Milli"
|Alltel Wireless People's Champ Award
|
|
|-
|rowspan="2"|"Lollipop" (featuring Static Major)
|Hottest Hip Hop Ringtone of the Year
|
|
|-
|rowspan="2"|Best Hip-Hop Video
|
|
|-
|rowspan="2"|"I'm So Hood (Remix)" (with DJ Khaled, Young Jeezy, Ludacris, Busta Rhymes, Big Boi, Fat Joe, Birdman & Rick Ross)
|
|rowspan="2"|
|-
|Best Hip-Hop Collabo
|
|-
|rowspan="6"|2009
|rowspan="5"|Lil Wayne
|Best Live Performer
|
|-
|Lyricist of the Year
|
|-
|MVP of the Year
|
|-
|Hustler of the Year
|
|-
|Best Hip Hop Style
|
|-
|"Mrs. Officer" (featuring Bobby Valentino)
|Best Hip Hop Collabo
|
|-
|rowspan="3"|2010
|rowspan="2"|Lil Wayne
|Lyricist of the Year
|
|-
|Best Live Performer
|
|-
|"Forever" (with Drake, Kanye West, Eminem)
|Reese's Perfect Combo Award
|
|-
|rowspan="15"|2011
|rowspan="5"|Lil Wayne
|Hustler of the Year
|
|-
|MVP Of The Year
|
|-
|Lyricist of the Year
|
|-
|Best Live Performer
|
|-
|Made You Look Award
|
|-
|"Motivation"
|Sweet 16: Best Featured Verse
|
|-
|rowspan="2"|"6 Foot 7 Foot" (featuring Cory Gunz)
|Best Club Banger
|
|-
|Verizon People's Champ Award
|
|-
|rowspan="3"|"I'm on One" (with DJ Khaled, Drake & Rick Ross)
|Best Hip Hop Video
|
|-
|Best Club Banger
|
|-
|rowspan="3"|Reese's Perfect Combo Award
|
|-
|"Hustle Hard (Remix)" (with Ace Hood & Rick Ross)
|
|-
|rowspan="3"|"Look at Me Now" (with Chris Brown & Busta Rhymes)
|
|-
|Best Hip Hop Video
|
|-
|Verizon People's Champ Award
|
|-
|rowspan="4"|2012
|"HYFR (Hell Ya Fucking Right)" (with Drake)
|Best Hip Hop Video
|
|-
|rowspan="2"|"The Motto (Remix)" (with Drake & Tyga)
|Reese's Perfect Combo Award
|
|-
|Best Club Banger
|
|-
|Lil Wayne
|Hustler of the Year
|
|-
|rowspan="2"|2013
|rowspan="2"|"Pop That" (with French Montana, Rick Ross & Drake)
|Reese's Perfect Combo Award
|
|-
|Best Club Banger
|
|-
|2014
|"My Hitta (Remix)" (with YG, Nicki Minaj, Meek Mill & Rich Homie Quan)
|People's Champ Award
|
|-
|rowspan="3"|2015
|Sorry 4 the Wait 2
|Best Mixtape
|
|-
|rowspan="2"|"Truffle Butter" (with Nicki Minaj & Drake)
|Sweet 16: Best Featured Verse
|
|-
|Best Collabo, Duo or Group
|
|-
|rowspan="2"|2018
||Lil Wayne
| I Am Hip Hop Award
|
|rowspan="2"|
|-
|"Dedication 6: Reloaded"
|Best Mixtape
|
|-
|2021
| "Whats Poppin (Remix)" (Jack Harlow, Tory Lanez & DaBaby)
|Best Collaboration
|
|}

Billboard Music Awards

|-
|rowspan="2"|2011
||Lil Wayne 
|Top Rap Artist
|
|-
|I Am Not a Human Being
|Top Rap Album
|
|-
|rowspan="6"|2012
|rowspan="4"|Lil Wayne
|Top Artist
|
|-
|Best Male Artist
|
|-
|Best Rap Artist
|
|-
|Top Streaming Artist
|
|-
|Tha Carter IV
|Best Rap Album
|
|-
|"Motivation"(with Kelly Rowland)
|Best R&B Song
|
|-
||2015
|"Loyal"
|Top R&B Song
|
|-

BMI Awards

|-
||2009
|Lil Wayne
|Urban Songwriter of the Year
|
|-
|rowspan="7"|2010
|Best I Ever Had
|rowspan="6"|Most Performed Urban Song of the Year
|
|-
|Every Girl
|
|-
|Forever
|
|-
|My Life
|
|-
|Successful
|
|-
|Turnin Me On
|
|-
|Lil Wayne
|Urban Songwriter of the Year
|
|-
|2019
|In My Feelings
|Most Performed R&B/Hip-Hop Songs
|
|}

Grammy Awards
The Grammy Awards are awarded annually by the National Academy of Recording Arts and Sciences. Lil Wayne has won five from twenty-six nominations.

|-
|2006
|"Soldier" (with Destiny's Child & T.I.)
|Best Rap/Sung Collaboration
|
|-
|rowspan="2"|2008
|"Make It Rain" (with Fat Joe)
|Best Rap Performance by a Duo or Group
|
|-
|Graduation (as featured artist)
|rowspan="2"|Album of the Year
|
|-
|rowspan="8"|2009
|rowspan="2"|Tha Carter III
|
|-
|Best Rap Album
|
|-
|"A Milli"
|Best Rap Solo Performance
|
|-
|"Lollipop" (with Static Major)
|rowspan="2"|Best Rap Song
|
|-
|rowspan="2"|"Swagga Like Us" (with T.I., Jay-Z & Kanye West)
|
|-
|rowspan="2"|Best Rap Performance by a Duo or Group
|
|-
|"Mr. Carter" (with Jay-Z)
|
|-
|"Got Money" (with T-Pain)
|Best Rap/Sung Collaboration
|
|-
| 2010 
| "Best I Ever Had" (as songwriter)
| Best Rap Song
|
|-
| 2011 
| Recovery (as featured artist)
| Album of the Year 
|
|-
|rowspan="5"|2012
|Tha Carter IV
|Best Rap Album
|
|-
|"Motivation" (with Kelly Rowland)
|rowspan="2"|Best Rap/Sung Collaboration
|
|-
|"I'm On One" (with DJ Khaled, Drake & Rick Ross)
|
|-
|rowspan="2"|"Look at Me Now" (with Chris Brown & Busta Rhymes)
|Best Rap Song
|
|-
|rowspan="2"|Best Rap Performance
|
|-
|rowspan="2"|2013
|"HYFR (Hell Ya Fucking Right)" (with Drake)
|
|-
|"The Motto" (with Drake)
|Best Rap Song
|
|-
|rowspan="2"|2016
|"Only" (with Nicki Minaj, Drake & Chris Brown)
|Best Rap/Sung Collaboration
|
|-
|"Truffle Butter" (with Nicki Minaj & Drake)
|rowspan="2"|Best Rap Performance
|
|-
|rowspan="2"|2017
|rowspan="2"|"No Problem" (with Chance the Rapper & 2 Chainz)
|
|-
|Best Rap Song
|
|-
|rowspan="3"|2023
|rowspan="3"|"God Did" (with DJ Khaled, Rick Ross, Jay-Z, John Legend, and Fridayy)
|Song of the Year
|
|-
|Best Rap Performance
|
|-
|Best Rap Song
|
|-

Hollywood Music in Media Awards

|-
|2016
||"Sucker for Pain"
|Best Original Song – Sci-Fi/Fantasy Film
|
|}

iHeartRadio Music Awards

|-
|2016
||"Truffle Butter" 
|Hip-Hop Song of the Year
|
|}

International Dance Music Awards

|-
|2016
|"Truffle Butter" 
|Hip-Hop Song of the Year
|
|}

Juno Awards 

|-
|2013
|"HYFR" 
|Video of the Year
|
|}

MOBO Awards
The MOBO Awards is an annual awards ceremony established in 1996 by Kanya King to recognize music artist on any race. Lil Wayne received one award from two nominations.

|-
|2008
|rowspan="2"|Lil Wayne
|Best Hip-Hop 
|
|-
|2010
|Best International Act
|
|}

MTV Video Music Award

|-
|2005
| "Soldier" (with Destiny's Child and T.I.) 
|Best Group Video
|
|-
|2006
|"Fireman"
|MTV2 Award
|
|-
|rowspan="2"|2008
|rowspan="2"|"Lollipop"
|Best Male Video
|
|-
|rowspan="4"|Best Hip Hop Video
|
|-
|2010
|"Forever" with Drake, Kanye West and Eminem
|
|-
|rowspan="3"|2011
|"6 Foot 7 Foot" with Cory Gunz
|
|-
|rowspan="2"| "Look at Me Now" (with Chris Brown and Busta Rhymes)
|
|-
| Best Collaboration|| 
|-
|rowspan="2"|2012
| "HYFR" (with Drake) 
|Best Hip Hop Video
| 
|-
| "How To Love"
| Best Video with a Message|| 
|-
|2014
| "Loyal" (with Chris Brown and Tyga) 
| Best Collaboration|| 
|-
|2016
| "Let Me Love You" (with Ariana Grande) 
| Best Collaboration||  
|-
|2017
| "I'm the One" (with DJ Khaled, Justin Bieber, Quavo and Chance the Rapper) 
| Best Hip Hop Video ||  
|}

MTV Europe Music Award

|-
|rowspan="2"|2008
|rowspan="5"| Lil Wayne
|Best Urban Artist
|
|-
|Artist Choice 
|
|-
||2010
|Best Hip-Hop
|
|-
|rowspan="2"|2011
|Best Hip-Hop
|
|-
|Best North American Act
|
|-

MTV2 Sucker Free Summit Awards

|-
|rowspan="7"| 2010
| "Always Strapped (Remix)" with Birdman, Rick Ross, Young Jeezy
| Remix of the Year
|
|-
| "Drop The World" with Eminem
| The People's Crown
|
|-
| "Forever" with Drake, Eminem, Kanye West
| Instant Classic
|
|-
| "I'm Single"
| Guerilla Video of the Year
|
|-
| "No Ceilings"
| Mixtape of the Year
|
|-
|rowspan="2"| "Roger That" with Young Money
| The People's Crown
|
|-
| Verse of the Year
|
|-
| 2011
| YMCMB
| Best Crew
|
|}

MuchMusic Video Awards

|-
|rowspan="3"| 2010
|rowspan="2"| "Forever" (with Drake, Eminem, Kanye West)
| YOUR FAVE Video
|
|-
| International Video of the Year by a Canadian
|
|-
| "Bedrock" (with Young Money and Lloyd )
| International Video of the Year – Group
|
|-
|rowspan="2"| 2011
| "Miss Me" (with Drake)
|rowspan="2"| Most Watched Video of the Year
|
|-
| "No Love" (with Eminem )
|
|-
| 2012
|"The Motto" (with Drake and Tyga)
| MuchVibe Best Rap Video
|
|}

NAACP Image Awards

|-
|| 2017
| "Mad" 
| Outstanding Duo or Group
| 
|}

Ozone Awards

|-
|rowspan="5"|2007
|rowspan="3"| Lil Wayne
| Mixtape Monster Award
| 
|-
| Best Lyricist
| 
|-
| Best Male Rap Artist
| 
|-
| "You" (with Lloyd)
| Best Rap/R&B Collaboration
| 
|-
| "We Takin' Over" (with DJ Khaled, T.I., Akon, Rick Ross, Fat Joe, & Birdman)
| Best Video
| 
|-
|rowspan="8"| 2008
|rowspan="5"| Lil Wayne
| Best Lyricist
| 
|-
| Best Rap Artist
| 
|-
| Pimp C Award
| 
|-
| Mixtape Monster Award
| 
|-
| TJ's DJ's Hustler Award
| 
|-
| Birdman
| Best Rap Group
| 
|-
| "Lollipop" (with Static Major)
| Club Banger of the Year
| 
|-
| "Duffle Bag Boy" (with Playaz Circle)
| Club Banger of the Year
| 
|}

People's Choice Awards 

|-
|2014
|Lil Wayne
|Favorite Hip-Hop Artist
|
|}

Soul Train Music Awards

|-
|2009
|"Turnin Me On" 
|rowspan="2"|Song of The Year
|
|-
|rowspan="3"|2011
|rowspan="2"|"Motivation" 
|
|-
|Best Dance Performance
|
|-
||"Look at Me Now" 
|rowspan="3"|Best Hip-Hop Song of The Year
|
|-
|2013
|"High School" 
|
|-
|rowspan="4"|2014
|rowspan="4"|"Loyal" 
|
|-
|Song of The Year
|
|-
|Best Dance Performance
|
|-
|Best Collaboration
|
|-
|2015
|"Truffle Butter" 
|Best Hip-Hop Song of The Year
|
|-
|rowspan="2"|2016
|rowspan="2"|  "No Problem" 
|Rhythm & Bars Award
|
|-
|Best Collaboration
|
|}

Source Awards

|-
|2000
|Lil Wayne
|Best New Artist
|
|}

Teen Choice Awards

|-
|2005
|"Soldier" 
|Choice Music: R&B/Hip-Hop Track
|
|-
|2008
|Lil Wayne
|Choice Music: Rap Artist
|
|-
|2010
|Young Money
|Choice Music: Best Group
|
|-
|2018
|"I'm the One" (with DJ Khaled, Quavo, Chance the Rapper and Lil Wayne)
|Choice Music: R&B/Hip-Hop Song
|
|}

Vibe Music Awards

|-
|2005
|"Soldier" (with Destiny's Child & T.I.)
|Coolest Collabo
|
|-
|rowspan="3"|2007
|Lil Wayne
|Best Rapper
|
|-
|"Da Drought III"
|Best Mixtape of the Year
|
|-
|"We Takin' Over"(with DJ Khaled, T.I., Akon, Rick Ross, Fat Joe, & Birdman)
|Coolest Collabo
|
|}

World Music Awards

|-
|2008
|Lil Wayne
|World's Best Selling Hip-Hop Artist
|
|}

Other accolades
"Hottest MC in the Game"
2011: No. 5 Hottest MC
2010: No. 7 Hottest MC
2009: No. 2 Hottest MC
2008: No. 3 Hottest MC
2007: No. 1 Hottest MC
"Hip Hop's Iconic Game Changer Award 2012"

References

Lil Wayne
Awards